Dean Arthur Amadon (June 5, 1912 – January 12, 2003) was an American ornithologist and an authority on birds of prey.

Amadon was born in Milwaukee, Wisconsin to Arthur and Mary Amadon. He received a BS from Hobart College in 1934 and a Ph.D. from Cornell University in 1947. In 1937 he joined the American Museum of Natural History in New York City and was Chairman of the Department of Ornithology there from 1957 until 1973. In 1942, he married Octavia Gardella and had two daughters: Susan Avis and Emily Yvonne.

Amadon was a member of the American Association for the Advancement of Science, president of the American Ornithologists' Union from 1964 to 1966 and Linnaean Society of New York. He joined The Explorers Club in 1959. His books included Eagles, Hawks and Falcons of the World (1968) with Leslie H. Brown, and Curassows and Related Birds (1973) with Jean Delacour. He died on January 12, 2003, in his home at 25 Kenwood Road, Tenafly, New Jersey.

References

Sources
 
 
 http://www.wku.edu/~smithch/chronob/AMAD1912.htm

1912 births
2003 deaths
American ornithologists
Cornell University alumni
Fellows of the Linnean Society of London
People associated with the American Museum of Natural History
People from Tenafly, New Jersey
20th-century American zoologists